Leo Rossi (born June 26, 1946) is an American actor, writer and producer. A character actor with over 100 credits to his name, he is known for his role as foul-mouthed EMT Vincent "Budd" Scarlotti in the 1981 horror film Halloween II, as the serial killer Turkell from the 1990 horror sequel Maniac Cop 2, and as Detective Sam Dietz in the Relentless franchise. His other films include Heart Like a Wheel (1983), River's Edge (1986), The Accused (1988), Analyze This (1999), One Night at McCool's (2001), and 10th & Wolf (2006).

Career 
Rossi began his career with small roles in films including the Rick Rosenthal-directed – John Carpenter-scripted – Halloween II (1981) with Jamie Lee Curtis and Donald Pleasence, in which he falls victim to the suburban maniac Michael Myers. Subsequent roles in Jonathan Kaplan's Heart Like a Wheel (1983) opposite Bonnie Bedelia and Beau Bridges, Tim Hunter's River's Edge (1986) with Dennis Hopper and Keanu Reeves, and Bob Rafelson's Black Widow (1987) – also with Hopper, Theresa Russell and Debra Winger – paved the way for a starring role opposite Jodie Foster and Kelly McGillis in Kaplan's The Accused (1988) as the film's central antagonist, Cliff "Scorpion" Albrect. The Accused in turn led to Rossi winning a starring role in William Lustig's Relentless (1989), a serial killer film which co-stars Judd Nelson and Robert Loggia; however, this time Rossi plays the central protagonist – Detective Sam Deitz – a role he would reprise in three sequels. Rossi followed up Relentless with Lustig's Maniac Cop 2 (1990), a horror film sequel starring Bruce Campbell and scripted by Larry Cohen.

During the 1980s, Rossi made guest appearances in the police procedural Hill Street Blues (1982), a recurring role; the science fiction series Amazing Stories by Steven Spielberg (1985); the crime drama 21 Jump Street with Johnny Depp (1988); and the Vietnam War drama Tour of Duty (1989).

Rossi began the 1990s with a performance in the 1991 action comedy Fast Getaway, about a father (Rossi) and son (Corey Haim) who rob banks together until the former is caught and imprisoned, and the latter is forced to break him out. Rossi then took a supporting role in Where the Day Takes You (1992), played a detective in the Pamela Anderson vehicle Raw Justice (1994), a street preacher in the teen comedy Dream a Little Dream 2 (1995) starring Corey Feldman and Corey Haim, and reprised his role opposite Haim in Fast Getaway 2 (1994). Rossi had a supporting role in the Harold Ramis comedy Analyze This (1999), in which he plays the evil cousin to Robert De Niro's character; other co-stars include Billy Crystal, Chazz Palminteri, and Lisa Kudrow.

His television appearances during the 1990s included Murder She Wrote (1992), Frasier (1997), JAG and a recurring role in ER (TV series) (1999). He portrayed a special agent in Kaplan's adaptation of Truman Capote's psychological drama In Cold Blood (1996); the latter – a miniseries set in 1950s America – co-stars Sam Neill and Eric Roberts.

In the 2000s saw Rossi took a supporting role in the Harald Zwart comedy One Night at McCool's (2001), The same year he accepted a role in the mobster thriller One Eyed King (2001). Next came a supporting role in the experimental drama The Business of Fancydancing (2002) and a part in Looney Tunes: Back in Action (2003), a live action-animation comedy directed by Joe Dante. Rossi then both produced and starred in the thriller 10th & Wolf (2006), in which he plays an FBI Agent partnered with Brian Dennehy who attempt to infiltrate a Sicilian Mafia family business. 10th & Wolf is loosely based upon the real-life Philadelphia crime family mafia war in the 1990s.

In TV, Rossi starred in another drama based on the life of Joseph D. Pistone, the 2000 CBS series Falcone, which is based on Pistone and Richard Woodley's book Donnie Brasco: My Undercover Life in the Mafia. He also appeared in Judging Amy (2001) and Without a Trace (2006).

Filmography

Films 

Alias Big Cherry (1975) – 'Big Cherry'
Mr. Billion (1977) – Italian Kidnapper
Grand Theft Auto (1977) – Vegas Muscle Chief
The Pirate (1978) TV Movie – Shadin
Circle of Power (1983) – Chris Morris
Halloween II (1981) – Budd Scarlotti
Heart Like a Wheel (1983) – Jack Muldowney
Kids Don't Tell (1985, TV Movie) – Detective Rastelli
River's Edge (1986) – Jim
Black Widow (1987) – Detective Ricci
Russkies (1987) – Keefer
Leonard Part 6 (1987) – Chef
Out of Time (1988, TV Movie) – Hawkins
The Accused (1988) – Cliff 'Scorpion' Albrect
Maniac Cop (1988) – Mayor's Chief of Staff (uncredited)
Hit List (1989) – Frank DeSalvo
Relentless (1989) – Sam Dietz
Maniac Cop 2 (1990) – Steven Turkell
Too Much Sun (1990) – George
Fast Getaway (1991) – Sam Potter
Where the Day Takes You (1992) – Mr. Burtis
We're Talkin' Serious Money (1992) – Charlie
Dead On: Relentless II (1992) – Sam Dietz
Casualties of Love: The "Long Island Lolita" Story (1993, TV Movie) – Bobby Buttafuoco
Relentless 3 (1993) – Sam Dietz
Rave Review (1994) – Brian
Fast Getaway II (1994) – Sam Potter
Runaway Daughters (1994) – Deputy 2
Raw Justice aka Good Cop Bad Cop (1994) – Lieutenant David Atkins
Reform School Girl (1994, TV Movie) – Disc Jockey
Relentless IV: Ashes to Ashes (1994) – Detective Sam Dietz
The Misery Brothers (1995) – Michael Misery
Mutant Species (1995) – Hollinger
Felony (1995) – Detective Kincade
Dream a Little Dream 2 (1995) – Street Preacher (Uncredited)
In the Kingdom of the Blind, the Man with One Eye Is King (1995) – Moran
Beyond Desire (1995) – Frank Zulla
The Assault (1996) – Zigowski
Wedding Bell Blues (1996) – Robert
True Friends (1998) – Carmine
Unconditional Love (1999) – Martin Ward
Analyze This (1999) – Carlo Mangano
The Mating Habits of the Earthbound Human (1999) – Mr. Smith
Fashionably L.A. (1999) – Acting Teacher
Fatal Conflict (2000) – Conrad Nash
Crackerjack 3 (2000) – Ricky Santeria-Ramos
Separate Ways (2001)
Road to Redemption (2001) – 'Sully' Santoro
Sticks (2001) – 'Domino'
One Night at McCool's (2001) – Joey Dinardo
One Eyed King (2001) – Joe 'Big Joe' Thomas
The Syndicate (2002) Short Film – Mr. Gianelli
Four Deadly Reasons (2002) – Otto
The Business of Fancydancing (2002) – Mr. Williams
Deranged (2002) – Artie
Looney Tunes: Back in Action (2003) – Acme Vice President, Climbing to the Top
The Last Letter (2004) – Judge
Mafioso: The Father, the Son (2004) – Vito Lupo
Shut Up and Kiss Me (2004) – Mario
Back by Midnight (2004) – 'Rusty'
Diamond Zero (2005) – Augustine Garza
All In (2006) – Dr. Hamilton
10th & Wolf (2006) – Agent Thornton
A Modern Twain Story: The Prince and the Pauper (2007) – Officer Harold
The Nail: Joey Nardone Story (2009) – Petey
PriMates (2010) – Ray
Sinatra Club (2010) – Castellano
Exodus Fall (2011) – Ford Ashworth
The Unlikely's (2012) – Gerald Maxwell
The Independents (2013) – David The BarberFragments from Olympus: The Vision of Nikola Tesla (2013) – HenryOn Painted Wings (2014) – The BossGotti (2018) – Bobby Boriello

 TV appearances Hill Street Blues – Domestic Beef – Season 3, episode 2 (1982) – Jon GennaroHill Street Blues – Heat Rash – Season 3, episode 3 (1982) – Jon GennaroHill Street Blues – Rain of Terror – Season 3, episode 4 (1982) – Jon GennaroT.J. Hooker – Lady in Blue – Season 2, episode 22 (1983) – Joe TateMike Hammer, Private Eye – Satan, Cyanide and Murder – Season 1, episode 10 (1984)Partners in Crime – Season 1, episodes 1–13 (1984) – Lieutenant Ed VronskyCagney & Lacey – Victimless Crime – Season 3, episode 3 (1984) – MoslovskyABC Afterschool Specials – One Too Many – Season 13, episode 7 (1985) – Mr. Jenkins
Hunter – Case X – Season 2, episode 1 (1985) – Tony Cochran
Steven Spielberg's Amazing Stories – Mr. Magic – Season 1, episode 8 (1985) – Murray
Hardcastle and McCormick – In the Eye of the Beholder – Season 3, episode 20 (1986) – Marvin
T.J. Hooker – Into the Night – Season 5, episode 17 (1986) – Salvatore Martel
Cagney & Lacey – Role Call – Season 6, episode 5 (1986) – Public Relations Man
Stingray – Anytime, Anywhere – Season 2, episode 13 (1987) – Johnny
CBS Summer Playhouse – Reno and Yolanda – Season 1, episode 13 (1987) – Ricky Barron
A Year in the Life – Goodbye to All That – Season 1, episode 15 (1988) – Mel
The Bronx Zoo – Career Day – Season 2, episode 5 (1988) – Tauber
Simon & Simon – Simon & Simon and Associates – Season 8, episode 2 (1988) – Al Krantz
21 Jump Street – Slippin' Into Darkness – Season 3, episode 2 – (1988)- Sergeant Walker
Tour of Duty – Saigon: Part 1 – Season 2, episode 1 (1989) – Jake Bridger
Tour of Duty – Saigon: Part 2 – Season 2, episode 2 (1989) – Jake Bridger
Murder, She Wrote – Murder on Madison Avenue – Season 8, episode 22 (1992) – Lieutenant Hornbeck
Mr. & Mrs. Smith – The Impossible Mission Episode – Season 1, episode 11 (1996) – Shelley
In Cold Blood (miniseries) (1996) – Agent Harold Nye
Frasier – Liar! Liar! – Season 4, episode 10 (1997)
Early Edition – Mob Wife – Season 1, episode 13 (1997) – Frank PirelliJAG – Dungaree Justice – Season 4, episode 12 (1999) – Peter ReardonSons of Thunder – Lost & Found – Season 1, episode 4 (1999) – Anthony CardoneER – Humpty Dumpty – Season 6, episode 7 (1999) – Detective CrusonER – Family Matters – Season 6, episode 10 (2000) – Detective CrusonFalcone – Pilot – Season 1, episode 1 (2000) – Noah DietrichFalcone – Double Exposure – Season 1, episode 4 (2000) – Noah DietrichFalcone – But Not Forgotten – Season 1, episode 7 (2000) – Noah DietrichFalcone – Paying the Piper – Season 1, episode 9 (2000) – Noah DietrichJudging Amy – Rights of Passage – Season 3, episode 8 (2001) – Mr. SchmeltzerWithout a Trace – Candy – Season 5, episode 2 (2006) – Leo Writer We're Talking Serious (1992) – Writer (also Charlie)Mafioso: The Father, the Son (2004) – Writer (also  Vito Lupo)Gotti (2017) – Writer (also Bobby Boriello)

 Producer We're Talkin' Serious (1992) – Co-ProducerRelentless 3 (1993) – Co-ProducerRelentless IV: Ashes to Ashes (1994) – Co-Producer10th & Wolf (2006) – ProducerThe Nail: The Story of Joey Nordone (2009) – ProducerPriMates (2010) – Co-Producer Music department Project X (1987) – Vocalizations Self Actors Entertainment (TV series), episode ActorsE Chat with Joe Sabatino and Leo Rossi (2009)Actors Reporters Interviews (TV Series), episode Exclusive Interviews with Working Actors Peter Onorati, Leo Rossi, James Quattrochi, Joe Sabatino (2009)The Nightmare Isn't Over: The Making of Halloween II'' (2012)

Awards and nominations

References

External links 

Production Company: (http://www.eastmanrossi.com/)

Living people
American male film actors
American male television actors
Actors from Trenton, New Jersey
American people of Italian descent
Male actors from New Jersey
20th-century American male actors
21st-century American male actors
1946 births
Writers from Trenton, New Jersey